Constantin Krage (10 June 1900 – 4 January 1984) was a Danish architect. His work was part of the architecture event in the art competition at the 1928 Summer Olympics.

References

1900 births
1984 deaths
20th-century Danish architects
Olympic competitors in art competitions